Basketball at the 2014 Summer Youth Olympics was held from 18 to 26 August at the Wutaishan Sports Center in Nanjing, China. As in 2010 the 3x3 format returned, along with a new event, the skill challenge.

Qualification
Each National Olympic Committee (NOC) could enter a maximum of 2 teams, 1 team of 4 athletes per each gender. As hosts, China was given 2 teams, 1 per each gender. 6 teams, 3 per each gender qualified at the 2013 U18 3x3 World Championships and another 6 teams, 3 per each gender qualified from the 2013 3x3 World Tour Final. The remaining 13 teams per gender qualified based on the FIBA 3x3 National Federation Ranking based on the update from 1 June 2014. All continents must have at least one team present in each gender and no more than 10 from the same continent can participate. A minimum of 30 NOCs must participate across all events.

To be eligible to participate at the 2014 Youth Olympics athletes must have been born between 1 January 1996 and 31 December 1997. Furthermore, all team members must have participated in two FIBA sanctioned 3x3 events between 1 April 2013 and 8 June 2014.

Boys

Girls

Format
The boys' and girls' tournament will adopt a round robin group stage and a single-elimination medal round, where the 20 participating teams are split into 2 pools of 10. Each team will play once against the other teams in its pool, and the top 8 teams from each pool will qualify for the knock-out stages.

Boys

Girls
Note: Guam entered a girls' basketball team into Group B of the competition; there was no Guam boys' team at the tournament

Schedule

The schedule was released by the Nanjing Youth Olympic Games Organizing Committee.

All times are CST (UTC+8)

Medal summary

Medal table

Results

References

External links
Official Results Book – 3x3 Basketball

 
Basketball
2014 in 3x3 basketball
2014
International basketball competitions hosted by China
2014–15 in Chinese basketball